Coleophora frischella, the clover case-bearer or Frisch’s case-moth, is a moth of the family Coleophoridae. It is found in most of Europe, east to the eastern parts of the Palearctic realm. It is also present in the Near East.

It is indistinguishable of Coleophora alcyonipennella from which it is separable only by dissection.

The wingspan is 11.5–14.5 mm. Adults are on wing from May to June and in August. There are two generations per year.

The larvae feed on the seeds of various Trifolium species. They live within the seedheads within a movable case.

References

External links
 

frischella
Moths described in 1758
Moths of Asia
Moths of Europe
Taxa named by Carl Linnaeus